Abdullah Al Islam Jakob is a Bangladesh Awami League politician and the present Chairman of the Standing Committee on Ministry of Youth & Sports and former deputy Minister of Environment and Forest. He is also a Member of Parliament from Bhola-4. His father M. M. Nazrul Islam was also a member of the Jatiya Sangsad.

Early life 
Jakob was born on 21 December 1972 in Char Fasson, Bhola District, Bangladesh.

Career 
Jakob was elected to parliament from Bhola-4 in 2014. He won at 11th Jatiya Sangsad general election, held on 30 December 2018. He built a 16-storey tower in Char Fasson, Bhola named Jakob Tower to promote tourism in Bhola.

References

Living people
1972 births
People from Bhola District
Awami League politicians
10th Jatiya Sangsad members
11th Jatiya Sangsad members

9th Jatiya Sangsad members